The Ugly Swans is a 2006 Russian science fiction drama film directed by Konstantin Lopushansky, based on the 1967 novel of the same name by Arkady and Boris Strugatsky. The film is often compared to Andrei Tarkovsky's Stalker, also adapted from a Strugatsky book.

Plot
The film's plot is loosely based on the novel, with some superficial differences. The story has been adjusted slightly to contextualize it in the "near future," with the main character Victor Banev recast as a UN envoy to the town of Tashlinsk, where a mysterious group has taken the town's children to an isolated boarding school. The major departure from the novel's plot is in the ending, in which the "Aquatters" ("Slimeys" from the novel) are all killed by the humans. The children are heroically rescued by Banev, but they are unable to reassimilate into society and are institutionalized.

A small role created for the film was a UN negotiator named Gennady Komov, a reference to a popular character from the Strugatskys' other books.

Awards
The film received the Best Score award at Kinotavr.

References

External links

Film description at the London Film Festival

2006 films
2000s science fiction drama films
Films based on works by Arkady and Boris Strugatsky
Films directed by Konstantin Lopushansky
Russian mystery films
Russian science fiction drama films
Russian dystopian films
Films about writers
2000s Russian-language films
Neo-noir
Films based on science fiction novels
Films based on Russian novels